The 25th Combat Aviation Brigade is a Combat Aviation Brigade of the United States Army's 25th Infantry Division based at Wheeler Army Airfield.

Structure

 1st Battalion (Attack Reconnaissance), 25th Aviation Regiment Arctic Sabers
 2nd Battalion, 25th Aviation Regiment Diamondhead
 3rd Battalion (General Support), 25th Aviation Regiment Hammerhead
 2nd Squadron, 6th Cavalry Regiment Lightning Horse
 209th Aviation Support Battalion Support or Die

References

Aviation Brigades of the United States Army